Gatelli or Gattelli is an Italian surname. Notable people with the surname include:

Christopher Gattelli, American choreographer, performer, and theatre director 
Daniela Gattelli (born 1975), Italian beach volleyball player
Mario Gatelli (born 1959), Italian Paralympic tennis player

Italian-language surnames